Juan González Arintero, O.P. (24 June 1860 – 20 February 1928) was a Spanish Catholic priest and theologian.

Biography
Arintero was born in Lugueros, León, and entered the Dominican Order at Corias (Asturias) in 1875. As a specialist in the natural sciences, he taught at colleges in Vergara, Corias, Valladolid and later at the Pontifical University of Saint Thomas Aquinas, Angelicum in Rome. In 1921 he founded in Bilbao the magazine La Vida Sobrenatural.

Father Arintero died in Salamanca in 1928.

Works
 (1892). El Diluvio Universal Demostrado por la Geologia.
 (1898). La Evolución y la Filosofía Cristiana.
 (1901). El Hexámeron y la Ciencia Moderna.
 (1904). Teología y Teofobia.
 (1908). Evolución Mística.
 (1916). Cuestiones Místicas.
 (1919). Exposición Mística del Cantar de los Cantares.
 (1923). Las Escalas del Amor ; reedición 2020 - Introducción .

Works in English translation
 (1949). The Mystical Evolution in the Development and Vitality of the Church.
 (1957). Stages in Prayer.

See also
 Marie-Joseph Lagrange
 Neo-Scholasticism
 Ramiro de Maeztu

References

Further reading
 Bandera, Armando (1987). El P. Juan G. Arintero: Renace la Mística. Avila: Asociación Educativa Signum Christi.
 Bandera, Armando (1989). Los Caminos de la Fe: Experiencia Creyente del P. Arintero. Salamanca: Editorial San Esteban.
 Gorce, M. M. (1937). "Arintero (Juan-Gonzales)." In: M. Viller (ed.): Dictionnaire de Spiritualité. Ascétique et Mystique. Vol. 1, Paris: Beauchesne, pp. 855–859.
 Llamera, Marceliano (1992). Los Santos en la Vida de la Iglesia según el P. Arintero. Salamanca: Editorial San Esteban.
 Lobo, Arturo Alonso (1970). El P. Arintero; Precursor Clarividente del Vaticano II. Salamanca: San Esteban.
 Lohrum, Meinolf (1993). "Arintero, Juan González, OP." In: W. Kasper: Lexikon für Theologie und Kirche. Herder Verlag, Freiburg, Basel, Wien.
 Plaza Aguilar, Saturnino (2004). La Evolución Doctrinal de la Iglesia según el P. Juan González Arintero O.P. Madrid: Fundación Universitaria Española.
 Rodríguez González, Valentín (2007). María en la Espiritualidad del Padre Juan González Arintero, O.P. Madrid: Fundación Universitaria Española.
 Suarez, Adriano (1936). Vida del M.R. Padre Fr. Juan G. Arintero. Cádiz: Salvador Repeto.

External links
 Juan González Arintero
 Dominican Contributions to the Spiritual Life of the Church
Arinteriana - vie et oeuvres du P. Arintero en français

1860 births
1928 deaths
People from the Province of León
Spanish Dominicans
Thomists
Spanish Roman Catholic priests